The Roper Hotel is located at 707 Third Street  in the city of Marble Falls, county of Burnet, in the U.S. state of Texas. It was erected circa 1888. The hotel was designated a Recorded Texas Historic Landmark in 1981, and added to the National Register of Historic Places listings in Burnet County, Texas on January 8, 1980. The two-story structure was originally built by George and Elizabeth Roper.

See also

National Register of Historic Places listings in Burnet County, Texas
Recorded Texas Historic Landmarks in Burnet County

References

External links

Hotel buildings completed in 1888
Buildings and structures in Burnet County, Texas
Commercial buildings on the National Register of Historic Places in Texas
Recorded Texas Historic Landmarks
National Register of Historic Places in Burnet County, Texas